Dave Nie (born 1940), is a male former cyclist and Cyclo-cross rider who competed for England.

Cycling career
Nie was the 1971 British national champion in the Madison with Geoff Wiles and was national runner-up in the 1969 elite road race.

He represented England in the road race, finishing in a very respectable eighth place, at the 1966 British Empire and Commonwealth Games in Kingston, Jamaica.

He was a member of the Chequers London and Dragon Road Clubs before turning professional where he rode for Holdsworth-Campognolo.

References

1940 births
English male cyclists
Cyclists at the 1966 British Empire and Commonwealth Games
Living people
Commonwealth Games competitors for England
People from Bentley, Hampshire